is a 2013 Japanese psychological drama film edited, written, and directed by Hirokazu Kore-eda, starring Masaharu Fukuyama in his first role as a father. It premièred on 18 May 2013 at the 2013 Cannes Film Festival, where it was nominated for the Palme d'Or. After the screening, the audience welcomed the film with a ten-minute standing ovation, and director Kore-eda and Fukuyama were moved to tears. In a 25 May 2013 ceremony, it won the Jury Prize and a commendation from the Ecumenical Jury. The award sparked a significant response in Japan, and the national theatrical release was brought forward by a week, on 28 September 2013.

The film was also shown at the 2013 Toronto International Film Festival, and won both the Rogers People's Choice Award at the 2013 Vancouver International Film Festival and the Wuaki. TV Audience Award at the 2013 San Sebastián International Film Festival.

Plot
Ryōta Nonomiya is a successful architect who is focused so much on work that he neglects his wife, Midori, and son, Keita. Upon his return home one day, Midori tells him that the hospital where Keita was born urgently needs to speak to them, and Ryōta senses trouble. After arriving at the hospital, the couple learn that their biological son Ryūsei was switched with Keita at birth, and after DNA tests prove the error, they must now make a life-changing decision to either keep Keita, the boy they raised as their own son, or exchange him for their biological son.

Ryōta and Midori soon meet with the other couple, Yukari and Yūdai Saiki, small-town folks who lack the money and drive that Ryōta possesses, but who have a better understanding of the importance of child and parent bonds. They share photos, and for the first time, Ryōta and Midori see their biological son, Ryūsei. After several meetings, they decide to exchange children for one Saturday. After several more meetings, they finally decide to exchange children permanently. All four parents have difficulty accepting the loss of their previous sons, and the absence of the parents they used to know causes both boys to shut down emotionally, culminating in Ryūsei running away from the Nonomiyas' home and returning to the Saikis'. Ryōta picks up Ryūsei and brings him back home.

Ryōta and Midori begin to bond with Ryūsei, who is also warming up to them. However, while going through the photos on his camera, Ryōta discovers a cache of photos of himself, mostly sleeping, that Keita took, and he breaks down crying. Ryōta now understands the errors of his ways. The three return to the Saiki family, but Keita runs away from Ryōta. While following him, Ryōta apologizes to Keita, and the two make amends. The film ends with the two returning to the Saikis', and both families entering the home.

Cast
Masaharu Fukuyama as Ryōta Nonomiya
Yōko Maki as Yukari Saiki
Jun Kunimura as Kazushi Kamiyama
Machiko Ono as Midori Nonomiya
Kirin Kiki as Riko Ishizeki
Isao Natsuyagi as Ryōsuke Nonomiya
Lily Franky as Yūdai Saiki
Jun Fubuki as Nobuko Nonomiya

Themes and analysis 
As pointed out by Nathan Southern of AllMovie, the film confronts two distant kinds of Japanese families coming from different social backgrounds and reflects opposing conceptions that coexist in contemporary Japanese society. These two families, as Mark Kermode notes on The Observer, are faced with the dilemma of retaining the children they have raised, on the basis of the bonds built with them over six years, or swap them and start over for the sake of blood lineage continuity.

Southern emphasizes Ryōta's transformation in dealing with this difficult choice: he is first convinced to make the swap, believing that the affinities with his biological son will emerge increasingly evident in the future. However, after several encounters with the Saiki family and the confrontations with Yūdai, who advises him not to neglect his family life, and after discovering photographs of him shot by Keita while he was asleep, he acknowledges his emotional bond with him.

Southern recalls two key sequences of the film, commenting that "Kore-eda has a poet's eye for human nuance": in the first scene, where Ryōta reviews Keita's snapshots, he remarks that Ryōta "discover[s] a part of himself that he never knew existed"; in the second one, where the two families casually pose together for a group photo, he witnesses how "we can see the differences not merely between the clans—one rigid and ascetic, one loose, emotionally free, and unrestricted—but between traditional and more modern Japanese conceptions of family."

David Cirone of J-Generation brings up the personal theme of balancing social norms with individual freedom, noting that Ryōta is "torn between his own expectations, those of his wife and family, and the mixed suggestions of those around him who all seem to know what's best for him and the children."

Reception

Box office 
In the opening weekend, the film topped the national ranking with 253,370 spectators and grossing ¥313.3 million. The film maintained the first position for two consecutive weeks, with 1,168,204 spectators and a box office revenue of ¥1.35 billion ($13.87 million in 2013) in the first 13 days, including pre-release days. It exceeded a revenue of ¥3 billion on 11 November, the 49th day of release, an uncommon achievement for an art film.

The final domestic box office revenue reported in January 2014 was ¥3.2 billion ($30 million).

Critical response 
Like Father, Like Son received mostly positive reviews. On the film review aggregator website Rotten Tomatoes, it holds an  approval score, with an average rating of  based on  reviews. The site's consensus reads, "Sensitively written, smartly directed, and powerfully performed, Like Father, Like Son uses familiar-seeming elements to tell a thought-provoking story." Metacritic gives the film a score of 73 out of 100, based on reviews from 33 critics, indicating "generally favorable reviews".

Andrew Chan of the Film Critics Circle of Australia writes, "Essentially, Like Father, Like Son is one of those rare films that keep the audience totally engaged, thoroughly profound, fully emoted and ultimately refreshing. In the scale of perfect cinema, this stands quite close." On the website of The American Spectator, Eve Tushnet wrote that the film "has some of the striking Kore-eda trademarks: the extraordinary acting from the children; the symmetrical framing and musical pacing; and the shifts between long shots in which all the people look tiny and child's-eye shots where all the people look huge." Andrew Schenker of Slant Magazine wrote a lukewarm review, praising the cinematography but also saying, "The film scores all of its thematic points early [and] unfolds among fairly ordinary lines, hitting all of the expected moments, and simply waiting out the time until Ryota realizes the inevitable folly of his decision."

The film was the choice of Joshua Rothkopf in IndieWire's 2018 list of the best Japanese films of the 21st century.

Remake
DreamWorks Studios has acquired remake rights to Like Father, Like Son after the film caught the eye of Steven Spielberg at Cannes. Chris and Paul Weitz are slated to direct.

References

External links
  – archived from the original on 24 May 2013
Like Father, Like Son at IFC Films

2013 films
2013 drama films
2013 independent films
2010s psychological drama films
Films directed by Hirokazu Kore-eda
Japanese drama films
Japanese independent films
Japanese psychological drama films
2010s Japanese-language films
2010s Japanese films